Thomas Sugden may refer to:
Thomas Sugden (farmer-politician), English American immigrant, farmer, and Wisconsin pioneer
Thomas Sugden (footballer), English football goalkeeper